Gary Burnell Beikirch (August 29, 1947 – December 26, 2021) was a United States Army soldier who received the United States military's highest decoration, the Medal of Honor, for his actions during the Vietnam War. A combat medic, Beikirch was awarded the medal for exposing himself to intense fire in order to rescue and treat the wounded, and for continuing to provide medical care despite his own serious wounds, during a battle at Dak Seang Camp.

Early life
Beikirch was born on August 29, 1947, in Rochester, New York.

Military service
Beikirch joined the United States Army in August 1967, just after finishing his second year of college in upstate New York. He was interested in becoming a Green Beret from the very beginning. He completed basic training at Fort Dix, New Jersey, and then went on to Fort Benning, Georgia, for jump school. He completed jump school, passed the Special Forces test and went on to training at Fort Bragg, North Carolina. After finishing phase one special forces training, he completed training to become a combat medic. During his time in the army, Beikirch served with the 3rd, 5th and 10th Special Forces Groups as a Light Weapons and Medical Specialist. He was sent to Vietnam in July 1969.

While serving as a sergeant with Company B of the 5th Special Forces Group, 1st Special Forces, Beikirch was stationed at Dak Seang Camp, home to Montagnard villagers and fighters, in the Central Highlands province of Kon Tum. On April 1, 1970, the camp was attacked by a numerically superior North Vietnamese force. While his Montagnard assistants treated the wounded, Beikirch fought back with a 4.2 inch mortar and, after that weapon was disabled by hostile fire, a machine gun. Learning that a fellow American soldier was wounded and lying in an exposed position, he ran through heavy fire to rescue the man. He was hit by shrapnel in the process, including one fragment which struck near his spine and partially paralyzed him. For the remainder of the battle he had his Montagnard assistants carry him from one position to another as he treated the injured. He was wounded in the side while giving mouth-to-mouth resuscitation to a Montagnard fighter and was then shot in the stomach. Despite this, he continued to provide medical care and fire his weapon from his stretcher until losing consciousness. He was evacuated by helicopter and spent six months recovering at Valley Forge Medical Center.

For his actions at Dak Seang, Beikirch was awarded the Medal of Honor. The medal was formally presented to him by President Richard Nixon on October 15, 1973.

Later life and death
After his military service, Beikirch attended White Mountain Seminary in New Hampshire, graduating in 1975. He planned to go back to Vietnam and work in a missionary hospital in Kon Tum Province, where he had served in the army; however, the country fell to North Vietnamese forces before he could return. He instead worked as a pastor and received a master's degree in counseling. Since the mid-1980s he had worked as a school counselor at Greece Arcadia Middle School in his native Rochester, New York.

On September 22, 2012, the Second Battalion of the Fifth Special Forces Group (Airborne) dedicated a new battalion operations complex. The complex, formerly called "The Legion", was named Beikirch Hall in tribute to the former member of the unit.

He died from pancreatic cancer in Rochester, New York, on December 26, 2021, at the age of 74.

In addition to his wife and children, Gary Beikirch is survived by one brother, Larry Scott Beikirch of Hall County, Georgia.

Military awards
Beikirch's military decorations and awards include:

 Medal of Honor
 Distinguished Service Cross (upgraded to the Medal of Honor)
 Silver Star
 Bronze Star Medal
 Purple Heart with oak leaf cluster
 National Defense Service Medal
 Vietnam Service Medal
 Vietnamese Cross of Gallantry with Silver Star
 Republic of Vietnam Campaign Medal

 Combat Infantryman Badge
 Parachutist Badge
 Special Forces Tab

Medal of Honor citation
Beikirch's official Medal of Honor citation reads:

See also

List of Medal of Honor recipients for the Vietnam War

References

External links
Medal of Honor Recipient Gary Beikirch Interview at the Pritzker Military Museum & Library
Blaze of Light: The Inspiring True Story of Green Beret Medic Gary Beikirch, Medal of Honor Recipient by Marcus Brotherton (WaterBrook/Penguin Random House, 2020)

1947 births
2021 deaths
Military personnel from Rochester, New York
United States Army soldiers
Combat medics
United States Army personnel of the Vietnam War
United States Army Medal of Honor recipients
Vietnam War recipients of the Medal of Honor
Deaths from cancer in New York (state)
Deaths from pancreatic cancer